The Saint Pierre River  was a river in the city of Montreal, Quebec, Canada, flowing into the St. Lawrence River. The city of Montreal was founded at its mouth, at the height of the site Pointe-à-Callière Museum.

Description 

The Saint Pierre river originated in the west of Montreal Island; one branch lead to the current Old Port of Montreal and the other poured into the river near the Aqueduct of Montreal in Verdun.  Not far from the Saint-Jacques escarpment, the river formed Otter Lake at the present location of the Turcot Interchange.

History

The river was long used as a sewer by area residents. In 1832, for safety's sake, it was decided to bury it by channeling in the nearby area Pointe-à-Callière Museum. The various other sections of the river were also buried in the following decades. The development of the property previously located southwest of the river resulted in  no visible traces remaining of the river.  In 1990, the collector was filled with sand, causing the complete disappearance of the river.

The sewer's relics can be seen at the Pointe-à-Callière Museum, while a section of its route is visible near the locks of the Côte-Saint-Paul of Lachine Canal.

See also 

 List of rivers and water bodies of Montreal Island
 List of rivers of Quebec
 Lachine Canal
 Pointe-à-Callière Museum

References

Saint-Pierre River
Saint-Pierre River
St. Pierre River
Tributaries of the Saint Lawrence River